El Litoral is a local newspaper published in Santa Fe, Argentina.

El Litoral was founded by Salvador Caputto in the important Paraná River port city of Santa Fe, and first published on August 7, 1918.

The daily was edited for much of the twentieth century by Pedro Vittori, after whom the avenue its headquarters are located on was named.

Directed by Nahuel Caputto since 2016, it remains that city's most important daily newspaper.

External links
Online edition

Daily newspapers published in Argentina
Spanish-language newspapers
Publications established in 1918